Paurodon is an extinct genus of Late Jurassic mammal from the Morrison Formation of the Western United States.

Taxonomy
Paurodon is the type genus of the dryolestidan group Paurodontidae. Araeodon, Archaeotrigon, Foxraptor, and Pelicopsis are apparently growth stages of Paurodon.

Distribution and stratigraphy
Remains of Paurodon have been found in stratigraphic zone 5 of the Morrison Formation in Como Bluff, Wyoming.

Biology
Paurodon was strongly convergent with modern golden moles in terms of dentition and jaw shape. This suggests that its diet was composed of earthworms (unlike other contemporary dryolestoids, which were more insectivorous) and may have even been subterranean, like the more derived Necrolestes.

See also

 Prehistoric mammal
 List of prehistoric mammals
 Paleobiota of the Morrison Formation

References

 Foster, J. (2007). Jurassic West: The Dinosaurs of the Morrison Formation and Their World. Indiana University Press. 389pp.

Dryolestida
Morrison mammals
Fossil taxa described in 1887
Prehistoric mammal genera